Starzlach is a river in the Allgäu region of the Bavarian Alps. Its main tributaries are Hörnlegraben and Letzenbach.

See also
List of rivers of Bavaria

References

Rivers of Bavaria
Rivers of Germany